Mats Nilsson is a 4-time All-American male javelin thrower competing for University of Alabama (1995–1998), University of Texas at El Paso (2000–2001), and the Swedish National Team (1991–2004). He was ranked top-10 in the world as a junior, a perennial medalist at the Swedish Championships, and became Crimson Tide's first NCAA champion in the javelin throw in history. Mats's older brother, Joakim Nilsson, was the catalyst for the Tide's throwers' program in the early 1990s, and was awarded the prestigious Bryant Student Athlete Award (1995) (named after Paul "Bear" Bryant) at the end of his career. Mats Nilsson received his PhD in exercise physiology.

Progression
 1989: 48.80 m/160.1 ft (600 g)
 1990: 63.02 m/206.7 ft (600 g)
 1991: 72.22 m/236.9 ft (600 g), 65.90 m/216.2 (700 g); EYOD Silver Medalist  European Youth Olympic Festival
 1992: 61 m/200.1 ft (800 g)
 1993: 66.72 m/218.8 ft (800 g) 
 1994: 70.14 m/230.1 ft (800 g); Junior World Championships 9th place
 1995: 72.20 m/236.8 ft (800 g) 
 1996: 76.66 m/251.5 ft (800 g); NCAA Silver Medalist, SEC Gold Medalist
 1997: 77.14 m/253.08 ft (800 g); NCAA Gold Medalist, SEC Gold Medalist, M22 European Championships 10th place

Other
 Ranked top-100 in the world 1996, 1997, 1998, 2003, and 2004 with the 800 g javelin
"All-American" 1996, 1997, 1998,  2000
WAC Champion 2000
Medalist Swedish Championships 1990, 1991, 1992, 1994, 1996, 1997, 2003, and 2004

Swedish male javelin throwers
Year of birth missing (living people)
Living people
Sportspeople from Stockholm County